Drugs & Aging is a monthly peer-reviewed medical journal published by Springer Nature under their Adis International imprint. It contains primarily review articles covering optimum use of drug therapies in older adults.

Abstracting and indexing 
The journal is abstracted and indexed in:

According to the Journal Citation Reports, the journal has a 2021 impact factor of 4.271.

References

External links 
 

Pharmacology journals
English-language journals
Publications established in 1991
Springer Science+Business Media academic journals
Monthly journals
Gerontology journals